Quaternary Research is a peer-reviewed scientific journal of Quaternary science. The journal was established in 1970, is now published by Cambridge University Press, and is edited by Derek B. Booth, Nicholas Lancaster and Lewis A. Owen. Previous editors included A. Lincoln Washburn, Estella B. Leopold, Stephen C. Porter, Eric J. Steig, and Alan R. Gillespie.

Abstracting and indexing 
The journal is abstracted and Indexed by: CABI, British and Irish Archaeological Bibliography, EBSCO, GEOBASE, Scopus, Gale, International Atomic Energy Agency, PubMed, Ovid, ProQuest, Web of Science, GeoRefIts.

The latest impact factor (2015) was 2.198.

External links 
 

Quaternary science journals
Cambridge University Press academic journals
Publications established in 1970
English-language journals
Bimonthly journals